2 Drink Minimum is an album by jazz guitarist Wayne Krantz.

Reception
The Allmusic review by David R. Adler awarded the album 4.5 stars stating "Essential listening for fans of gritty, non-commercial fusion music.".

Track listing
 "Whippersnapper" – 6:47
 "Dove Gloria" – 4:54
 "Shirts Off" – 7:29
 "Dream Called Love" – 9:20
 "AFKAP" – 7:11
 "Isabelle" – 8:17
 "Alliance / Secrets" – 6:50
 "Lynxpaw" – 1:40

Personnel
 Wayne Krantz – guitar
 Lincoln Goines – bass guitar
 Zach Danziger – drums

References

External links
[ 2 Drink Minimum Overview] – from Allmusic
2 Drink Minimum – from Enja Records

Wayne Krantz live albums
1995 live albums
Enja Records live albums
Live instrumental albums